Adam Andrzej Wiercioch (born November 1, 1980) is a Polish fencer who won a silver medal in Men's Team Épée (Fencing) at the 2008 Summer Olympics in Beijing, together with Tomasz Motyka, Radosław Zawrotniak, and Robert Andrzejuk.

For his sport achievements, he received: 
 Golden Cross of Merit in 2008.

See also
List of Pennsylvania State University Olympians

References

External links 
 
 
 
 
 

1980 births
Living people
Polish male fencers
Fencers at the 2008 Summer Olympics
Olympic fencers of Poland
Olympic silver medalists for Poland
Pennsylvania State University alumni
Sportspeople from Gliwice
Medalists at the 2008 Summer Olympics
Olympic medalists in fencing
20th-century Polish people
21st-century Polish people